My Little Pony: The Movie is a 1986 American animated musical fantasy film based on the Hasbro toyline My Little Pony. Theatrically released on June 6, 1986, by De Laurentiis Entertainment Group, the film features the voices of Danny DeVito, Madeline Kahn, Cloris Leachman, Rhea Perlman and Tony Randall.

Produced by Sunbow Productions and Marvel Productions, with animation production by Toei Animation in Japan and AKOM in South Korea, the film was succeeded by a television series anthology which ran in late 1987. A ten-part episode from that series, The End of Flutter Valley, served as a sequel to the film.

Plot 

At their home, Dream Castle, the ponies are running and playing through flowery meadows and grassy green fields with their animal friends. Elsewhere, Baby Lickety-Split is practicing a new dance step, as Spike, a baby dragon, accompanies her rehearsal on the piano. Meanwhile, at the Volcano of Gloom, a wicked witch named Hydia is planning to ruin the ponies' festival, but her two sincere but incompetent daughters, Reeka and Draggle, are not up to her family's standards of wickedness, and she laments about it, before sending them off to ruin the festival. During the baby ponies' dance performance, Baby Lickety-Split attempts to add her own dance and ruins the whole performance. She is told off by everyone and runs away, followed by Spike, only to end up falling down a waterfall and trapped in a valley. Meanwhile, Reeka and Draggle try to ruin the ponies' festival by flooding the area, but thanks to the Sea Ponies, end up getting washed away in an overflowing waterfall.

The ponies send out a search party to find Baby Lickety-Split and Spike, while Hydia decides to concoct the Smooze, an unstoppable purple ooze that will bury and destroy everything in its path. It will also make anyone who is splashed by it grumpy and woeful. Her daughters go and collect the ingredients for the Smooze, leaving out the flume, an ingredient that they are afraid of retrieving. Hydia releases the Smooze which rages towards the Dream Castle, trapping Spike and Baby Lickety-Split inside a mountain. All the ponies are forced to evacuate as the castle and the surrounding land is submerged by Smooze. The search party continues its attempt to locate Lickety-Split before the Smooze nearly engulfs them. Later, two Pegasus ponies, Wind Whistler and North Star, travel to the human world to fetch Megan, the keeper of the Rainbow locket, bringing Megan's younger siblings, Danny and Molly, along as well. Megan releases the Rainbow of light into the Smooze, but it is swallowed up and lost. Despite this loss halting the Smooze, the ponies are discouraged by this, but Megan offers the encouragement that another rainbow lies out there. Meanwhile Hydia discovers the Smooze was lacking flume. Enraged, she sends her daughters to get the missing ingredient from an octopus-like plant monster that lives on a rocky outcrop near the volcano. The monster punishes the sisters, until Reeka bites a tentacle, thereby injuring the plant, and they escape with some flume. Hydia adds it to the Smooze, which is reactivated.

Megan accompanies two ponies on a visit to the Moochick, who gives the trio a new home (Paradise Estate) and a map to find the Flutter Ponies who might stop the Smooze. A group led by Megan sets out to find Flutter Valley, while Spike and Baby Lickety-Split run into five ugly but well-meaning creatures called Grundles, whose home, Grundleland, was covered by the Smooze in the past. Meanwhile, on the quest to find the Flutter Ponies, Megan gets lost in a field of giant sunflowers, almost becoming a victim of the Smooze. Hydia sees the Smooze has failed to kill the ponies and sends 'Ahgg', her pet, after them. Meanwhile, Spike, Baby Lickety-Split, and the Grundles almost fall victim to the Smooze, with Spike's tail being smoozed, but they escape by floating down the river on a log, and end up in a clearing by a well, where Baby Lickety-Split, feeling down about the situation she is in, hears echoes in the well and rescues Morning Glory, a Flutter Pony who fell in earlier. She is informed of the Smooze and so promises to lead them to Flutter Valley. Meanwhile, the team on the quest to find the Flutter Ponies press on through Shadow Forest, where they are attacked by sentient trees which fire sharp branches at them. After escaping the forest, they find that the high narrow final pass into Flutter Valley is blocked by Ahgg, a giant spider, and its web, and Megan is once more in danger, but is saved by Wind Whistler. When out of the canyon, the group finds Flutter Valley and meet with the queen Rosedust, who refuses to get involved at first, until Baby Lickety-Split arrives, safe and sound, along with Spike, the Grundles, and Morning Glory. There is much argument about non-involvement in other ponies' problems from the flutter ponies. Even though Morning Glory pleads with their queen to help their cousins, Rosedust still hesitates, until after Baby Lickety-Split appears to sway her enough to aid in the defeat of the Smooze.

The other ponies and forest animals are about to be covered by the Smooze as the witches watch from their ship. The Flutter Ponies come to the rescue and destroy the Smooze, with their magical wind, Utter Flutter, uncover the rainbow and drop the witches back into the volcano with the sticky goo. The Grundles are given the ruins of Dream Castle, all the ponies and Spike who were covered in Smooze are cleaned by the Flutter Ponies' Utter Flutter, and the Rainbow of Light is returned to the ponies. With all problems resolved, the ponies take Megan and her siblings back home.

Voice cast 
 Danny DeVito as Grundle King
 Rhea Perlman as Reeka
 Madeline Kahn as Draggle
 Cloris Leachman as Hydia
 Tony Randall as Moochick
 Charlie Adler as Spike and Woodland Creature
 Russi Taylor as Morning Glory, Rosedust, Skunk and Bushwoolie
 Tammy Amerson as Megan
 Jon Bauman as The Smooze
 Michael Bell as Grundle
 Sheryl Bernstein as Buttons, Woodland Creature and Bushwoolie
 Susan Blu as Lofty, Grundle and Bushwoolie
 Nancy Cartwright as Gusty and Bushwoolie #4
 Cathy Cavadini as North Star
 Peter Cullen as Grundle and Ahgg
 Laura Dean as Sundance and Bushwoolie #2
 Ellen Gerstell as Magic Star
 Keri Houlihan as Molly
 Katie Leigh as Fizzy and Baby Sundance
 Scott Menville as Danny
 Laurel Page as Sweet Stuff
 Sarah Partridge as Wind Whistler
 Alice Playten as Baby Lickety Split and Bushwoolie #1
 Jill Wayne as Shady and Baby Lofty
 Frank Welker as Bushwoolie #3 and Grundle

Music

Production 
My Little Pony: The Movie was one of the first projects for Nelson Shin's AKOM studio. Amid an emergency rush, Shin and his crew spent ten weeks on the film's 300,000 cels. Japan's Toei Animation also worked on the production.

Release

Box office 
Opening in only 421 theaters on June 6, 1986, My Little Pony: The Movie grossed just under US$6 million in ticket sales at the North American box office. With a US$674,724 gross on its wide debut, it remains one of the weakest on record among major features. Hasbro lost US$10 million on the combined poor performance of this, and their next collaboration with De Laurentiis Entertainment Group (DEG), The Transformers: The Movie. It also forced the producers of these films to make G.I. Joe: The Movie a direct-to-video release instead of theatrical, as well as scrap a Jem movie then in development. However, The Transformers: The Movie was itself later reassessed on VHS, DVD and Blu-ray by viewers, and has over the decades risen to become a popular cult classic.

Critical reception 
As with various other films of the 1980s designed to promote toy lines, My Little Pony: The Movie was widely panned by critics. The New York Times''' Nina Darnton, aware of its marketing purposes, added in her review: "Unlike the great Disney classics, there is nothing in this film that will move young audiences, and there are very few bones of wit thrown to the poor parents who will have to sit through the film with children of this age group." Movie historian Leonard Maltin seemed to agree, calling the picture "...A good concept hampered by poor animation; too 'cute' for anybody over the age of 7." According to Halliwell's Film Guide, My Little Pony came off as an "immensely distended cartoon meant to plug a fashionable line of children's dolls."

 Home media 
In the United States, the film was released on VHS and Beta by Vestron Video in late October 1986. Its Laserdisc was released in mid-1988.

The film was released on DVD in the United Kingdom in 2003 by Prism Leisure. The first DVD release in the United States was released in late 2006 by Rhino Entertainment; musical moments from the film were used as its only extras. The film was later re-released on January 27, 2015 by Shout! Factory.

A home media bundling both this film and the namesake 2017 film was released on October 16, 2018, commemorating the 35th anniversary of the My Little Pony toyline. The releases contain the same bonus features as its DVD/Blu-ray counterparts.

 In other media 
An episode of My Little Pony: Friendship Is Magic'' from its fifth season, "Make New Friends but Keep Discord", features the Smooze, a creature that originally appeared in the film. In the episode, Discord brings the creature into the Grand Galloping Gala to separate Fluttershy from her new friend, Tree Hugger. The Smooze is noticeably different than how it appears in the movie- for example, it is green instead of purple.

References

External links 
 
 
 
 

My Little Pony films
1986 films
1986 animated films
1980s American animated films
1980s children's animated films
1980s musical fantasy films
American children's animated adventure films
American children's animated fantasy films
American children's animated musical films
American musical fantasy films
Animated films based on animated series
Animated films about dragons
Films about witchcraft
Films scored by Robert J. Walsh
Films set in a fictional country
Films set in castles
De Laurentiis Entertainment Group films
Marvel Productions films
Sunbow Entertainment films
Toei Animation films
1980s English-language films